Ishozi is a small town in the Kagera Region, in northwestern Tanzania, not far from the shores of Lake Victoria.

Location
The coordinates of the town are:01 09 00S, 31 45 54E (Latitude:-1.1500; Longitude:31.7650).

Population
The exact population of Ishozi is unknown.

External links
Google Satellite Map of Ishozi, Tanzania

See also
Kagera Region

References

Populated places on Lake Victoria
Cities in the Great Rift Valley
Populated places in Kagera Region